Shiloh Branch  is a stream in Bourbon County, Kansas and Vernon County, Missouri. The stream is a tributary to the Marmaton River.

The creek was named after the ancient city of Shiloh.

See also
List of rivers of Kansas
List of rivers of Missouri

References

Rivers of Bourbon County, Kansas
Rivers of Vernon County, Missouri
Rivers of Kansas
Rivers of Missouri